Stenström is a Swedish surname. Notable people with the surname include:

Anna-Brita Stenström (born 1932), Swedish academic linguist
Filip Stenström (born 1991), Swedish footballer
Johan Stenström (born 1951), Swedish literary scholar
Oscar Stenström (1978–2015), Finnish cyclist
Thomas Stenström (born 1988), Swedish singer

Swedish-language surnames